Struggle from the Subway to the Charts is the debut album from Nuttin' But Stringz. The two singles from the album are "Dance with My Father" and "Thunder."

Track listing
 "Broken Sorrow" – 4:45
 "Struggle" – 4:04
 "Thunder" – 3:44
 "Beauty from Afar Intro" – 0:51
 "Beauty from Afar" – 4:05
 "Suka 4 Her (Interlude)" – 0:41
 "Suka 4 Her" – 5:46
 "Get Low" – 3:28
 "Egyptian in the Night Intro" – 1:27
 "Egyptian in the Night" – 4:37
 "A Nu Day" – 4:15
 "Dance with My Father" (bonus track) – 4:04
 "Thunder (Remix)" (bonus track) – 1:25

Story
Struggle from the Subway to the Charts is something of an autobiographical concept album, telling the story of the two brothers' struggle for fame from the streets of New York City. The plot consists of a dark, introductory piece (Broken Sorrow), followed by the brothers facing a tense situation during a ride on the subway (Struggle) and the expression of their emotional dilemmas (Thunder). They also deal with sentimental conflicts like love and attraction (Beauty from Afar and Suka 4 Her); this  romantic sense of love is contrasted by the more superficial infatuation then experienced at a party (Get Low). Later, when the brothers are aboard a metaphorical plane toward rising success, they experience a vivid, exciting dream (Egyptian in the Night). They ultimately "awake" from their situation, feeling emotionally revived, discarding their earlier "broken sorrows", and rejoicing in the fruition of their achievements (A Nu Day).

Additionally, the album covers Luther Vandross' "Dance with My Father" and includes a remix of "Thunder".

Charts 
The album debuted at #3 in Japan.

2006 debut albums
Nuttin' But Stringz albums